La Aldea de San Nicolás is the westernmost municipality of the island of Gran Canaria in the Las Palmas province of the Canary Islands. Its full name was, until 2005, La Aldea de San Nicolás de Tolentino, and the locals simply call it La Aldea. Its population is 8,228 (2013), and the area is 123.58 km2. Its elevation is about 33m.

La Aldea de San Nicolás is located about 38 km southwest of the island capital Las Palmas. It is situated among forested mountain valleys overlooking the Atlantic, and most families work on the tomato-farms, as well as growing potatoes and other vegetables and fruits, irrigated by reservoirs that collect winter rain. Tourism is also a significant industry, though not as much as in the South of the island.

San Nicolás is the birthplace of Román Rodríguez Rodríguez, President of the Canary Islands from 1999 to 2003.

Historical population

See also
List of municipalities in Las Palmas
Nicholas of Tolentino, a Christian saint

References

External links
Mancomunidaddelnorte.org

Municipalities in Gran Canaria